Leucopsina is a genus of small-headed flies endemic to Australia. Flies in the genus are colored black and yellow, mimicking the appearance of a wasp. Males and females measure 9.0 mm and 12.0 mm, respectively.

Species
 Leucopsina burnsi (Paramonov, 1957)
 Leucopsina odyneroides Westwood, 1876

References

Acroceridae
Nemestrinoidea genera